Bacheh Darreh (also known as Bacheh Darreh-ye Soflá, Bāgh-e Darreh-ye Soflá, Bāsh Darreh, and Besh Darreh) is a village in Jargalan Rural District, Raz and Jargalan District, Bojnord County, North Khorasan Province, Iran. At the 2006 census, its population was 1,621, in 423 families.

References 

Populated places in Bojnord County